Hapoel Ironi Kiryat Shmona Football Club known as Ironi Kiryat Shmona is an Israeli football club based in Kiryat Shmona. The club is a current member of the Israeli Premier League, and plays at the Ironi Stadium. They won their first league title in 2011–12.

History
The club was founded in 2000 by a merger of Hapoel Kiryat Shmona of Liga Alef and Maccabi Kiryat Shmona of Liga Bet, and took Hapoel Kiryat Shmona's place in Liga Alef, as well as playing at Hapoel's stadium. The merger was initiated by businessman Izzy Sheratzky owner of Ituran Location and Control, who are the official sponsors of the team.

In the new club's first season they won the North Division of Liga Alef and were promoted to Liga Artzit. In 2002–03 they finished as runners-up to Hakoah Ramat Gan and were promoted to Liga Leumit. In their first season at the second level they narrowly missed out on promotion, only finishing below runners-up Hapoel Nazareth Illit on goal difference. They finished third again in 2005–06, but won the league in 2006–07 to earn promotion to the Israeli Premier League, the first time a club from the town had played in the top division. In the same season they also won the Liga Leumit Toto Cup.

The club's first season in the Premier League saw them finish third and qualify for the UEFA Cup. In their first season in Europe, home matches had to be played at the Kiryat Eliezer Stadium in Haifa. After knocking out FK Mogren, they lost to Litex Lovech in the second qualifying round.

In 2008–09, the club finished bottom of the Premier League and were relegated to Liga Leumit. However, the following season they won the division and were promoted back to the Premier League.

On 15 December 2009, Ironi Kiryat Shmona won the 2009–10 Toto Cup Leumit.

On 19 January 2011, Ironi Kiryat Shmona won the 2010–11 Toto Cup Al, a year after winning the Leumit version of the cup, it was their first major title. In addition, Ironi Kiryat Shmona became the first team to win both first and second Toto Cup trophy in a back-to-back year.

On 24 January 2012, Ironi Kiryat Shmona defended their Toto Cup Al by beating Hapoel Tel Aviv in the 2011–12 Toto Cup Al finals.

On 2 April 2012, Ironi Kiryat Shmona won the Israeli Premier League and became the 14th Israeli champions. They won the league after finishing their match against runner-up Hapoel Tel Aviv in a goalless draw with five rounds left in the league. Their championship was the first to be won by a team outside the three major cities (Tel Aviv, Jerusalem and Haifa) for almost 30 years.

On 20 May 2012, The club changed its badge due to UEFA sponsorship rules which forbids the use of a sponsor name in both the kit and team badge. The new badge includes a number of footballs including a big one which used in the former badge, the Lion of Judah statue from the Battle of Tel Hai and a gold star to mark the only team championship.

In 2020, the club were on the verge of relegation to the Liga Leumit, trailing three points behind the 12th placed team (safe from relegation) with one match to go, but managed to stay in the Israeli Premier league and finished 12th thanks to goal difference.

European record

Current squad

Out on loan

Foreigners for 2022–23 season
Only up to six non-Israeli nationals can be in an Israeli club squad. Those with Jewish ancestry, married to an Israeli, or have played in Israel for an extended period of time, can claim a passport or permanent residency which would allow them to play with Israeli status.

 Ivan Bakhar
 Gian
 Marlon Santos
 Senin Sebai
 Džiugas Bartkus
 Joseph Mbong

Former players
  Luis Alberto Gutiérrez
  Yves Yuvuladio
  Ezechiel N'Douassel
  Ahmed Abed
  Shimon Abuhatzira
  Danny Amos
  Barak Badash
  Barak Bakhar
  Benny Ben Zaken
  Shavit Elimelech
  Elad Gabai
  Guy Haimov
  Roi Kahat
  Adrian Rochet
  Abbas Suan
  Guy Tzarfati
  Shir Tzedek
  Eitan Tibi
  Sean Weissman
  Radu Gînsari
  Levi García
  Kenny Saief
 Yuval Spungin (born 1987), Israeli footballer
 Nicolás Valansi (born 1979), Argentine-Israeli footballer

Club staff

Managers
 Benny Tabak (July 2001 – May 2)
 Ran Ben Shimon (July 2006 – April 8)
 Eli Cohen (16 December 2008 – 16 April 2009)
 Ran Ben Shimon (16 April 2009 – 13 May 2012)
 Gili Landau (13 May 2012 – 3 October 2012)
 Barak Bakhar (3 October 2012 – 14 May 2015)
 Salah Hasarma (May 2015 – February 2016)
 Shlomi Dora (February 2016 – May 2016)
 Motti Ivanir (May 2016–October 2016)
 Benny Ben Zaken (October 2016–November 2016)
 Tomer Kashtan (November 2016– May 2017)
 Haim Silvas (May 2017-December 2018)
 Tomer Kashtan (December 2018-May 2019)
 Shimon Edri (May 2019)
 Messay Dego (May 2019-October 2019)

Titles
Israeli Premier League
Winners 2011–12
Israel State Cup
Winners 2013–14
Toto Cup
Winners 2010-11, 2011-12
Israel Super Cup
Winners 2015

References

External links
Club website 
Kriyat Shmona in UEFA

 
Association football clubs established in 2000
Ironi Kiryat Shmona
Ironi Kiryat Shmona
2000 establishments in Israel